
Year 53 BC was a year of the pre-Julian Roman calendar. At the time, it was known as the Year of the Consulship of Messalla and Calvinus (or, less frequently, year 701 Ab urbe condita). The denomination 53 BC for this year has been used since the early medieval period, when the Anno Domini calendar era became the prevalent method in Europe for naming years.

Events 
 By place 

 Roman Republic 
 Consuls: Marcus Valerius Messalla and Gnaeus Domitius Calvinus.
 Parthian War: 
 Crassus sacks the Temple of Hierapolis and the Temple in Jerusalem on his way to engage the Parthians.
 May 6 – Battle of Carrhae: Romans defeated, and Crassus killed, by Parthians led by General Surena.
 Gallic War:
 Julius Caesar suppresses a revolt led by Ambiorix near Sabis (Northern Gaul).
 At Cenabum (modern Orléans) Roman merchants are massacred by the Carnutes.
 Vercingetorix, an Arverni chieftain, leads a revolt against Caesar in Central Gaul.
 Winter – Caesar enrolls non-citizen soldiers in Gallia Transalpina, genesis of Legio V Alaudae. He increases his army to ten legions.

 Armenia 
 Artavasdes II becomes king of Armenia.

Births 
 Aristobulus III, high priest of Jerusalem (d. 36 BC)
 Yang Xiong, Chinese politician and philosopher (d. AD 18)

Deaths 
 May 6 (executed after the Battle of Carrhae)
 Marcus Licinius Crassus, Roman politician and general
 Publius Licinius Crassus, son of Marcus Licinius Crassus
 Abgar II, Arab king of Edessa (modern Turkey)
 Gaius Scribonius Curio, Roman statesman and orator

References